Daingerfield State Park, in Morris County southwest of Texarkana, is a  recreational area (including  Lake Daingerfield), deeded in 1935 by Georgia Anna 'Chambers' Connor, and opened in 1938.

History

The original improvements were made by the Civilian Conservation Corps (CCC) between 1935 and 1939. This area was the center of the iron industry in Texas; nearby is Lone Star Steel Company.

Activities

The park offers picnicking; camping; boating (5 MPH speed limit); fishing; swimming in an unsupervised swimming area; hiking; and nature study. A seasonal concession (March - October) rents pedal boats and canoes. Tours may be arranged by special request. Year-round boat rentals are available.

Area Attractions

Nearby attractions include Lake Bob Sandlin State Park, Atlanta State Park, and Caddo Lake State Park; Starr Family Home State Historic Site; Morris County Museum; Wildflower Trails 3rd weekend in April; and Jefferson Historical Pilgrimage and Mardi Gras Jefferson in February; and the Daingerfield Fall Fest in Daingerfield on the 2nd weekend in October.

Facilities

Facilities include restrooms with and without showers; picnic sites including a group picnic area with tables (not covered); campsites with water; campsites with water and electricity; campsites with water, electricity, and sewer; a group lodge (Bass Lodge - capacity 20 persons: five bedrooms and two baths)(weekend reservation for Friday or Saturday requires reserving both nights); an overflow camping area; an amphitheater on the lake side; a launching ramp; a boat dock; a fishing pier; and a fish-cleaning facility; 2½ miles of hiking trails; a playground with slides and swings; cabins with heating and air-conditioning, and kitchen facilities (linens and towels are furnished; but utensils, dishes, and silverware are not); Year-round boat rentals are available (also sell drinks, snacks, fishing supplies, and bait); and a Texas State Park Store is at the park.

References

External links 

Daingerfield State Park information from the Texas Parks and Wildlife Department
Film segment of Daingerfield State Park from Adventure at Our Door (c. 1959) on the Texas Archive of the Moving Image

Protected areas of Morris County, Texas
Protected areas established in 1938
State parks of Texas
1938 establishments in Texas